Henry Lane Williams (July 26, 1869 – June 14, 1931) was an American football player and coach. He served as the head football coach at the United States Military Academy in 1891 and the University of Minnesota from 1900 to 1921, compiling a career college football record of 141–34–12. Williams's Minnesota Golden Gophers teams won eight Western Conference—now known as the Big Ten Conference—titles and his 136 wins are the most of any coach in team history. He was inducted into the College Football Hall of Fame as a coach in 1951.

Coaching career
After playing football at Yale University under head coach Walter Camp, where with Camp he co-invented the "tackle-back" formation, Williams began his coaching career at the United States Military Academy in 1891 while he was a teacher at Siglar Academy in Newburgh, New York. He then moved to Philadelphia where he enrolled at the University of Pennsylvania School of Medicine while he coached football and track at William Penn Charter School.

In 1900, Williams was hired as the head football coach at the University of Minnesota, where he invented the Minnesota shift. His Minnesota Golden Gophers were Big Ten Conference champions eight times (1900, 1903, 1904, 1906, 1909, 1910, 1911, 1915). Williams had a 136–33–11 record at Minnesota. His winning percentage (.786) is the highest of any Gopher football coach to date with the exception of Wallie Winter who went 6–0 in his only season 1893. In 1903, the Gophers went 14–0–1. Their lone tie came against Fielding H. Yost's Michigan Wolverines. After the contest, the Wolverines left behind their water jug at Northrop Field, which gave rise to the Little Brown Jug, one of the oldest and most famous college football trophies.

Williams was inducted into the College Football Hall of Fame with the inaugural class in 1951. Williams Arena, the home venue for Minnesota basketball, was renamed in his honor after a remodeling in the 1950s.

Legacy
Williams coaching tree includes:
Bernie Bierman
Gil Dobie
Clark Shaughnessy

Head coaching record

College

References

External links
 
 

1869 births
1931 deaths
19th-century players of American football
American football halfbacks
Army Black Knights football coaches
Minnesota Golden Gophers football coaches
Yale Bulldogs football players
High school football coaches in Pennsylvania
College Football Hall of Fame inductees
Perelman School of Medicine at the University of Pennsylvania alumni
Coaches of American football from Connecticut
Players of American football from Hartford, Connecticut